The Legend of Valentino is a 1975 American made-for-television biographical film written and directed by Melville Shavelson. It deals with real life events about the actor and sex symbol of the 1920s Rudolph Valentino.

It was broadcast by ABC on November 23, 1975.

Not to be confused with the 1961 documentary film "The Legend of Valentino".

Cast
 Franco Nero	 as 	Rudolph Valentino
 Suzanne Pleshette	 as 	June Mathis
 Judd Hirsch	 as 	Jack Auerbach
 Lesley Ann Warren	 as  	Laura Lorraine (as Lesley Warren)
 Milton Berle	 as  	Jesse L. Lasky
 Yvette Mimieux	 as  	Natacha Rambova
 Harold J. Stone	 as 	Sam Baldwin
 Alicia Bond	 as 	Nazimova
 Constance Forslund  as  	Silent Star
 Brenda Venus as Constance Carr

Reception
It was the 16th highest rated show of the week when it aired.

References

External links

1975 television films
1975 films
1970s biographical films
American television films
American biographical films
Biographical television films
Films about Rudolph Valentino
Films directed by Melville Shavelson
Films scored by Charles Fox
Films set in the 1920s
1970s English-language films
1970s American films